This is a list of companies having stocks that are included in the S&P MidCap 400 (S&P 400) stock market index. The index, maintained by S&P Dow Jones Indices, comprises the common stocks of 400 mid-cap, mostly American, companies. Although called the S&P 400, the index contains 401 stocks because it includes two share classes of stock from 1 of its component companies.



S&P 400 MidCap Index Component Stocks

Selected past and announced changes to the list of S&P 400 components

S&P Dow Jones Indices updates the components of the S&P 400 periodically, typically in response to acquisitions, or to keep the index up to date as various companies grow or shrink in value.

See also
List of S&P 500 companies
List of S&P 600 companies

References

SandP 500 companies
S&P Dow Jones Indices